The  is a 23.6 km Japanese railway line operated by the third-sector railway operator Tosa Kuroshio Railway. It connects Nakamura Station in the city of Shimanto with Sukumo Station in the city of Sukumo in Kōchi Prefecture.

Stations

History
The Tosa Kuroshio Railway was established on 8 May 1986 for the purpose of resuming construction of the Sukumo and Asa lines, which had been planned by JNR but abandoned. The company acquired a license to operate the Sukumo Line in February 1987, and commenced construction of the line, which opened on 1 October 1997.

See also
 List of railway lines in Japan

References

Rail transport in Kōchi Prefecture
1067 mm gauge railways in Japan
Railway lines opened in 1997
Japanese third-sector railway lines
1997 establishments in Japan